The 1944 Connecticut gubernatorial election was held on November 7, 1944. It was the third consecutive gubernatorial race between the same two nominees. Incumbent Republican Raymond E. Baldwin defeated Democratic nominee Robert A. Hurley with 50.48% of the vote.

General election

Candidates
Major party candidates
Raymond E. Baldwin, Republican
Robert A. Hurley, Democratic

Other candidates
Jasper McLevy, Socialist
Joseph C. Borden Jr., Socialist Labor

Results

References

1944
Connecticut
Gubernatorial